Henry Charles Goodwin (June 25, 1824 – November 12, 1860) was a U.S. Representative from New York.

Born in DeRuyter, New York, Goodwin completed preparatory studies.  He studied law with Aretmas V. Bentley, was admitted to the bar in 1846 and commenced practice in Hamilton, New York.  He served as district attorney of Madison County from 1847 to 1850.

Goodwin was elected as a Whig to the Thirty-third Congress to fill the vacancy caused by the resignation of Gerrit Smith and served from November 7, 1854, to March 3, 1855.  He was elected as a Republican to the Thirty-fifth Congress (March 4, 1857 – March 3, 1859).

He resumed the practice of law and died Hamilton on November 12, 1860. He was interred in Hamilton's Madison Street Cemetery.

References

1824 births
1860 deaths
New York (state) lawyers
County district attorneys in New York (state)
New York (state) Whigs
Whig Party members of the United States House of Representatives
Republican Party members of the United States House of Representatives from New York (state)
Burials in New York (state)
19th-century American politicians
19th-century American lawyers